Aaron Chandler (born October 3, 1983, Denver, Colorado, United States) is a former American soccer player and current City attorney. The forward played professionally for the California Victory; D.C. United and the Columbus Crew of Major League Soccer.

Career 
Chandler played collegiate soccer at the University of San Francisco.  After initially walking onto the team in 2003, he became an All-American and West Coast Conference Player of the Year in 2004. By the time his career was finished in 2006 he had started 66 of 75 games, where he scored 28 goals and assisted on 16 more.

He was drafted in the fourth round, 41st overall, by the Columbus Crew in the 2007 MLS SuperDraft.  Chandler netted a goal in the 86th minute of the inaugural Lamar Hunt Pioneer Cup match between the Crew and FC Dallas on March 11, 2007, a 3-0 win for the Black & Gold.  He was waived by the Crew on July 3, 2007, to make room for defender Andrew Peterson on the roster.

Later in 2007, Chandler played 13 matches for California Victory, a USL First Division professional soccer team.  Following the September 2007 demise of the Victory, Chandler went on trial for the Norwegian 1st Division side Sandefjord Fotball in February 2008, playing in the pre-season friendlies vs. FC Lyn Oslo on 1 February 2008 (0-3) and vs. Raufoss IL on 13 February 2008 (3-3), but did not get a contract. Chandler then moved on to Western Norway and a trial with the 1st Division side FK Haugesund, playing in the friendly vs. Løv-Ham on 16 February 2008 (0-3). FKH's coach Rune Skarsfjord said he was impressed by Chandler, but that he did not fit well enough into the club's 4-3-3 system and was therefore not offered a contract.

In September 2008, Chandler negotiated a short-term contract with Norwegian 1st Division side IL Hødd. He played briefly for Hødd.

References

External links
 Profile at MLSNet

1983 births
Living people
American soccer players
Soccer players from Denver
Columbus Crew players
USL First Division players
California Victory players
San Francisco Dons men's soccer players
IL Hødd players
American expatriate soccer players
Expatriate footballers in Norway
American expatriate sportspeople in Norway
Columbus Crew draft picks
Association football forwards